U.S. Highway 59 (US-59) heads along the eastern portion of the state of Oklahoma. US-59's  route through Oklahoma takes it through the mountainous terrain of the eastern Oklahoma Ouachitas and Ozarks. US-59 serves several lakes and towns through Oklahoma's Green Country, including Grand Lake, a major recreation center. The route enters the state from Arkansas near Fogel, Arkansas, and ends at the Kansas state line south of Chetopa, Kansas.

US-59 was first designated in Oklahoma around 1935. The highway's route at that time was largely the same as it is today; however, between the Afton area and Welch, US-59 passed through Vinita instead following the modern-day route passing east of it. US-59 was changed to follow the present-day route in 1951. Since then, US-59 has undergone only minor adjustments, many of which eliminated curves and provided a more direct route for travelers using the highway to traverse eastern Oklahoma.

Route description

Le Flore County 
US-59 enters Oklahoma in Le Flore County, in the Ouachita National Forest, at the state line at Fogel, Arkansas. US-270 is concurrent with US-59 as it crosses the line. The two routes head westward from the state line, passing through a valley between Black Fork Mountain and Rich Mountain. The first Oklahoma town the two routes pass through is unincorporated Page. Northwest of town, US-59 and US-270 form the northern terminus of US-259, which heads south towards Longview, Texas and Nacogdoches, Texas crossing I-30 and I-20. After this junction, US-59 and US-270 curve around to the north and pass through the two small hamlets of Zoe and Stapp. US-59 and US-270 head north, paralleling the Black Fork Poteau River as they leave the national forest, into Hodgen. North of Hodgen, the highways cross the main branch of the Poteau River and pass through the Wister Wildlife Management Area. Upon landing on the north bank of the river, US-59 and US-270 curve to the northeast as they enter Heavener, where SH-128 terminates. On the north side of the town, US-270 splits away to the west. US-59 parallels the Kansas City Southern Railroad and passes Heavener Memorial Cemetery. The highway turns to the northwest, passing through Howe, and intersects with SH-83 at its northern terminus. North of this junction, US-59 crosses the Poteau River again.

US-59 heads northward, coming to an interchange with US-271 just north of the Choctaw Country Club in the city of Poteau, county seat of Le Flore County. At this interchange, US-59 exits from the mainline to join US-271; continuing north through the interchange places the motorist on the Poteau Bypass, an unnumbered state highway. US-59 and US-271 proceed through Poteau, coming to an interchange at the southern terminus of SH-112, which is also the northern terminus of the Poteau Bypass. The two concurrent roads head north through the towns of Shady Point and Panama. North of Panama, US-59 and US-271 form the eastern terminus of SH-31. At Sunset Corner, US-59 turns to the west and US-271 turns to the east, ending the concurrency. Just north of this junction, US-59 widens to a four-lane divided highway. It crosses the Arkansas River on a bridge just downstream of the dam that impounds Robert S. Kerr Reservoir. Upon crossing the river, the highway enters Sequoyah County.

Sequoyah and Adair counties 
US-59's first highway junction in Sequoyah County is with SH-141 west of Gans, where the latter highway reaches its western terminus. US-59 continues northward, crossing Wildhorse Mountain as well as Little Sallisaw Creek, just upstream of where it empties into Robert S. Kerr Reservoir. The highway then enters the county seat of Sequoyah County, Sallisaw, where it has an interchange with Interstate 40 at Exit 308. North of the interstate, US-59 intersects US-64, turning east to follow the latter route into downtown Sallisaw. US-59 splits away to the north, becoming a two-lane highway. North of town, the highway serves as the western terminus of SH-101. US-59 then passes through unincorporated Brushy. North of Brushy, the highway winds through the Brushy Mountains. The road exits Sequoyah County north of this group of mountains.

The next county US-59 enters is mountainous Adair County. The route continues to follow a winding course as it makes its way northeast to unincorporated Cherry Tree. The highway continues northeast past Cherry Tree, before turning back to a due north course as it makes its way into the county seat of Stilwell. Here, the U.S. route has brief concurrencies with SH-100 and SH-51. US-59 leaves Stilwell, twisting through mountainous terrain alongside Peavine Creek until the stream's mouth at the Baron Fork of the Illinois River. The highway crosses the Baron Fork, then passes west of the unincorporated location of Baron. From Westville, US-59 heads northward. The highway passes just east of Mission Mountain; north of the mountain, the road begins paralleling a Kansas City Southern railroad line. In northern Adair County, US-59 serves unincorporated Ballard and the town of Watts, where it runs just west of Lake Frances. North of Watts, the highway crosses the Illinois River and continues northward into Delaware County.

Delaware, Ottawa, and Craig counties 
In Delaware County, US-59 enters West Siloam Springs and becomes concurrent with US-412. The two roads head westward through West Siloam Springs before coming to unincorporated Flint. US-59 and US-412 split here, with US-412 following the Cherokee Turnpike, which begins at this interchange. The eastern terminus of US-412 Alternate is also at this interchange; it becomes concurrent with US-59 as the two routes head west. The two highways enter Kansas, Oklahoma, where they part ways at an intersection with SH-10; US-412 Alternate continues to the east, while US-59 turns north along SH-10. Just north of this intersection lies an interchange with mainline US-412, which is still on the Cherokee Turnpike at this point. US-59 and SH-10 head north out of the town of Kansas, intersecting with SH-116 at its western terminus west of Colcord. As US-59 and SH-10 follow a course with many curves as they approach Eucha Lake, which they bridge the east arm of. In Jay, SH-20 joins the concurrency as US-59 and SH-10 turn east toward downtown Jay. There, the three highways form the southern terminus of SH-127. On the east side of Jay, US-59 and SH-10 turn north, leaving SH-20 as it heads east towards its intersection with Arkansas Highway 43. North of Jay, US-59 and SH-10 intersect with SH-127 again, this time at its northern terminus. US-59 and SH-10 cross over the Honey Creek arm of Grand Lake o' the Cherokees before coming to Grove, where SH-10 turns east and US-59 turns west. As it leaves Grove, US-59 turns northwest, running the length of a peninsula out into the lake. At the end of the peninsula, US-59 crosses the lake yet again, landing on the north shore near Copeland. The highway then passes into Ottawa County.

The next highway junction for US-59, the first in Ottawa County, is with SH-125. US-59 turns due west shortly after this junction, then curves to due north. Just east of Afton, US-59 joins US-60 and US-69, and the three highways head northeast. US-59 and US-69 continue northward to Narcissa, where they are the site of SH-25's eastern terminus. Further north, at Dotyville, US-59 meets SH-10 again, turning west along it, while US-69 heads east along SH-10 toward Miami. US-59 and SH-10 continue west, turning north for  before turning back to the west. Southwest of Dawes, the highways cross into Craig County. The northernmost town that US-59 serves in Oklahoma is Welch. Here, US-59 splits away from SH-10, turning northward along unsigned SH-2, its final stretch in Oklahoma.

History 
Before US-59 was designated in Oklahoma, what would become its route was designated as US-270 between the Arkansas state line and Poteau, US-271 between Poteau and Sunset Corner, SH-10 along the modern-day SH-9 concurrency, SH-17 between Sallisaw and West Siloam Springs, SH-33 between West Siloam Springs and the town of Kansas, and SH-10 between Kansas and Grove. There was no road between modern-day SH-9 and Sallisaw. US-59 first appeared on the official state map in 1935. At this time, the road south of Sallisaw was marked as "Conditional Location", and between Grove and the Kansas state line, the highway followed a different route: it proceeded west out of Grove to meet US-60 / US-66 south of Afton, concurring with those two highways to Vinita, where it turned north along SH-2, following it to Welch and the state line.

The gap between SH-10 and Sallisaw was filled by the designation of a state highway there by the Oklahoma State Highway Commission on November 15, 1935. The commission designated this highway as US-59, effective upon the completion of its construction. Maintenance of the portion of this road in Sequoyah County was authorized on October 22, 1936.

On October 3, 1951, the highway commission approved the realignment of US-59 between the highway junction northeast of Afton and Welch. The old highway between Vinita and Welch became the northern SH-2. The Highway Commission modified US-59's route through Westville on February 5, 1952. Previously, at the site of the present-day US-59 / US-62 intersection, US-59 turned east along US-62, splitting off at Williams Avenue, then followed Williams Avenue north to Main Street, where it turned east. With the 1952 realignment, US-59 continued straight through the intersection, bypassing Westville to the west. The next change to US-59 was a realignment between the SH-33 junction in the town of Kansas and downtown Jay. This change was approved by the Highway Commission on August 19, 1952.

On July 6, 1964, the Oklahoma State Highway Commission approved a realignment to US-59's route through Poteau. Another change, further north, was approved on March 4, 1968. This moved US-59 onto a new bridge over the Arkansas River upon completion of its construction, with the old highway being turned over to the U.S. Army Corps of Engineers. An application for this change was received by the American Association of State Highway Officials (AASHO) on March 26, 1968, and approved by that body on June 18, 1968.

The highway commission approved another alteration to US-59 in the Poteau area on February 5, 1973. On that date, the commission approved a realignment of US-59 from a point south of the intersection with US-270 and US-271, to that junction, and on into Poteau. The realignment was submitted to AASHO on April 10 of that year, received on April 13, and approved on June 26. A section of highway north of Jay was straightened on October 7, 1974. On March 7, 1977, the Oklahoma State Transportation Commission (which had replaced the highway commission) approved another straightening in the Howe area. The realignment was approved by AASHTO on July 7, 1977.

AASHTO approved the realignment on June 29, 1982. The transportation commission approved on October 4, 1982.

On September 7, 1999, the Oklahoma State Transportation Commission approved an item realigning US-59 and SH-100 in Stilwell, removing US-59 from Second Street and placing it on Front Street.

The section of US-59 between I-40 and SH-9 was pressed into service as a detour for eastbound I-40 traffic after the collapse of its bridge over the Arkansas River on May 26, 2002.

Junction list

Poteau Bypass

U.S. Route 59 Bypass, also known as the Cavanal Expressway, is a special route of U.S. Route 59 running along the west outskirts of Poteau.

On the official state highway maps, US-59 is shown routed along the bypass. It is signed alternately as US-59 Bypass and US-59/US-271.

References

External links

US-59 at OKHighways

 Oklahoma
U.S. Highways in Oklahoma
U.S. Route 59
U.S. Route 59
U.S. Route 59
U.S. Route 59
U.S. Route 59
U.S. Route 59